Doomsday Castle is a reality television series on National Geographic Channel, that was canceled in 2013, showing the lives of Brenton Bruns and his five children preparing for the end of the world, in a castle he has built near Pickens, South Carolina. The show is a spin-off of Doomsday Preppers; Bruns and his castle were originally featured on the season 2 episode "No Such Thing as a Fair Fight".

Bruns says he built a castle to survive an electromagnetic pulse, since a castle can survive without electricity and defend against raiders. It started as a bunker in 1999, and is continuously being added to. Bruns states that his property is covered with booby traps, and his neighbors are "serious preppers with lots of guns".

Episodes

Season 1 (2013)

References

External links
 Official website
 
 First episode on National Geographics official YouTube channel

2010s American reality television series
Survivalism in the United States
National Geographic (American TV channel) original programming
Television shows set in South Carolina
2013 American television series debuts
2013 American television series endings
American television spin-offs
Reality television spin-offs